Hazara Express (Hindko/) is a passenger train operated daily by Pakistan Railways between Karachi and Havelian in Khyber Pakhtunkhwa province.

History
The Hazara Express was originally called the Chenab Express before 2006. Pakistan Railways renamed it as Hazara Express and began the express train in collaboration with Pakistan Railways Advisory & Consultancy Services on 15 February 2006.

Route
 Karachi City–Khanewal Junction via Karachi–Peshawar Railway Line
 Khanewal Junction–Shorkot Cantonment Junction via Khanewal–Wazirabad Branch Line
 Shorkot Cantonment Junction–Lala Musa Junction via Shorkot–Lalamusa Branch Line
 Lala Musa Junction–Taxila Cantonment Junction via Karachi–Peshawar Railway Line
 Taxila Cantonment Junction–Havelian via Taxila–Khunjerab Railway Line

Station stops

Equipment
The train has economy class accommodation.

References

Named passenger trains of Pakistan
Passenger trains in Pakistan